Granite Construction Inc. is a civil construction company and aggregate producer, a member of the S&P 600 Index based and founded in Watsonville, California , and is the parent corporation of Granite Construction Company.  The company is both a heavy civil construction contractor and construction aggregate manufacturer, owning or leasing quarries in several Western states for extracting mostly sands, gravel, and crushed stone products.  Most of Granite's operations exist within the state of California, with some attention given to operations outside of where the company was founded.

Incorporated in 1922 and publicly traded since 1990, Granite Construction Company is composed of a construction materials division, and two construction operating divisions (California Group, and Central Group).  Under each group are numerous regional offices, quarries, asphalt and concrete plants.  Granite's California Group comprises five regions, based on geographically limited areas within the state.  Granite's Central Group comprises six regions, representing states and specific markets outside of California: Arizona, Texas, Florida, Illinois, Federal, and Water/Minerals.

Granite Construction works in both public and private sector transportation infrastructure projects that include: roads and highways, bridges, dams, water reservoirs, railroads, seaports, and airports. The materials division produces construction materials such as sand, gravel, ready-mix and asphalt concrete.

As of 2022, Granite was ranked 28th on ENR's Top 400 Contractors (by overall revenue).

References

External links
 Official Granite Construction website
 Company information – NYSE.

Construction and civil engineering companies of the United States
Companies based in Santa Cruz County, California
Watsonville, California
Construction and civil engineering companies established in 1922
1922 establishments in California
Companies listed on the New York Stock Exchange